Odondebuenia balearica, the Coralline goby, is a species of goby native to the Mediterranean Sea where it prefers coralline areas at depths of from .  This species grows to a length of  TL.  This species is the only known member of its genus.

References

Gobiidae
Monotypic fish genera
Fish described in 1907